Toledo is an unincorporated community in Cleveland County, Arkansas, United States. From 1873 to 1891, the community served as the county seat. During the town's heyday, there were several businesses and a school. In 1882 the railroad bypassed the community and the county seat moved to Rison. People moved away and the once-thriving town reverted to farmland.

Geography

Notes

References

Unincorporated communities in Cleveland County, Arkansas
Unincorporated communities in Arkansas